The 2 Litre Brennabor  Typ E  is a car manufactured, briefly, by Brennabor in 1933 as a successor to the company's Typ B “Juwel 6.

The Typ E was powered by a 6-cylinder 2-litre side-valve engine, mounted ahead of the driver and delivering 38 hp at 3,200 rpm.  Power was delivered to the rear wheels through a single-plate dry clutch and a four-speed gear box controlled using a centrally positioned floor-mounted gear stick.   A freewheel device within the clutch was offered as an option.

The car sat on a U-profile pressed steel chassis with rigid axles and semi-eliptical leaf springing.   It was offered only as a four-door sedan/saloon.   The mechanically linked foot brake operated directly on all four wheels, while the handbrake operated on the rear wheels.

At the same time, the company launched the 2.5-litre  Brennabor  Typ F.   This was similar in most respects, but retained the larger 2460 cc engine from the Typ B “Juwel 6.   Thus equipped, the Type F provided 45 hp of output.

1933 was a year of continuing economic difficulty for the German economy.   Brennabor's output had continued to slide, from 1,655 units the equivalent of 3.0% of the German passenger car market in 1931, to 522 units, equivalent to a market share of 1.3% in 1932.    By the end of 1933 the company had abandoned automobile production in order to focus on light-weight motor bikes.   When automobile production was suspended, it is estimated that the combined output of Typ Es and Typ Fs amounted to approximately 200 cars.

Technical data

Sources 
 Oswald, Werner: Deutsche Autos 1920–1945. Motorbuch Verlag Stuttgart, 10. Auflage (1996), 
 

Brennabor vehicles